Abigail Lucy Cruttenden (born 23 March 1968) is an English actress.

Cruttenden played opposite Sean Bean as his character Richard Sharpe's wife Jane in several episodes of the TV series Sharpe. In 2007, Cruttenden joined the cast from the first series of the ITV comedy series Benidorm, playing the character of Kate Weedon.  She has appeared in the sitcom Not Going Out as Anna since 2014.

Early life
Cruttenden is from a family with history in the acting industry. Her grandmother, Cynthia Coatts (1915-2013) founded the Rosslyn School of Dance and Drama in London, while her mother, Julia Cruttenden (1938-2013), ran the stage make-up school Greasepaint in London. Her father Neville (1940-1990) was an advertising executive who also indulged in amateur theatrics before deciding to become a professional actor at 49. Her brother is Hal Cruttenden, a stand-up comedian, and she has an older sister Hannah, who works in journalism.

Career
Cruttenden started her acting career when she was 12, appearing in the BBC2 Playhouse episode Elizabeth Alone in 1981. She gained significant notice in only her second screen role in the critically acclaimed TV film P'tang, Yang, Kipperbang, playing the object of affection to a lovesick schoolboy in the coming of age drama, which was written by Jack Rosenthal. As she recalled in a newspaper interview in 1996, she did not realize she would have to kiss costar John Albasiny towards the film's climax. "I was 14 and painfully shy, like my character. I vividly remember them saying we had to kiss at the end. I was completely thrown because it wasn't in the script. Tears welled in my eyes and I mumbled 'All right then.' But I had never kissed anyone before, ever. It was all rather traumatic."

She continued to have regular acting work throughout her teenage years, including a regular role in the TV sitcom Mog (1985-86), the TV Aids drama Intimate Contact (1987) and The StoryTeller episode "Hans My Hedgehog" in 1987. Despite coming from a family involved in the acting industry, her parents were keen for her to concentrate more on her schooling. By this point, Cruttenden was thoroughly committed to acting, and when she was offered the stage role in Romeo and Juliet halfway through sitting for the last two of her four A levels, she took the role.

Cruttenden immersed herself in her acting work, taking roles in TV shows TECX, Coasting and Centrepoint (all 1990), and appearing in the detective series Van Der Valk and The Casebook of Sherlock Holmes in 1991.

After a break from TV to do more theatre work, she appeared on screen for the first time in three years in the TV period comedy drama Love on a Branch Line in 1994, a role which required her to appear nude. Then in 1996 she was cast as Jane Gibbons in the TV series Sharpe as the love interest and eventual wife of Richard Sharpe, played by Sean Bean.  

She continued to find regular work in the theatre and on television, with roles in Doctors and Nurses (2004) and The Robinsons (2005), but it was not until she was cast in the TV sitcom Benidorm in 2007 that she gained another hit show. She appeared in the first three series until she left the show in 2009.

There was a dearth of screen roles for the next 5 years, with only an appearance in an episode of the sitcom The Royal Bodyguard in 2012 during this time. Since 2014, she has been a regular on the sitcom Not Going Out, playing the role of Anna, Hugh Dennis' wife and snobby neighbour to Lee and Lucy.

Personal life 
In 1990 her father Neville died suddenly of a stomach haemorrhage, aged 50. He had left his job as an advertising executive the year before to become a professional actor, and had had two TV roles in the pipeline before his sudden death. 

In 2013 Cruttenden suffered a double family bereavement. On 16 March she lost her grandmother Cynthia Coatts, who died at the age of 97. Then on 14 December she lost her mother Julia after a long battle with a brain tumour. 

During the filming of Sharpe, Cruttenden met actor Sean Bean. They married on 22 November 1997. Their daughter was born in November 1998. They divorced in July 2000. In 2003, she married Jonathan R. Fraser. They have a daughter.

Cruttenden lives in East Sheen, south-west London.

Filmography

Television

Film

Radio

Theatre
 The Seagull by Anton Chekhov (2013) – Arkadina
 Her Naked Skin by Rebecca Lenkiewicz (2018) – Celia Cain

References

External links
 
 

1968 births
Living people
20th-century English actresses
21st-century English actresses
Actresses from London
English film actresses
English radio actresses
English stage actresses
English television actresses
People from Richmond, London